Volovăț is a commune located in Suceava County, Bukovina, northeastern Romania. It is composed of a single village, namely Volovăț, and also included Burla village until 2004, when it was split off to form a separate commune.

At the 2011 census, 98.7% of inhabitants were Romanians and 1% Roma. 54.8% were Romanian Orthodox and 44.8% Pentecostal.

References 

Communes in Suceava County
Localities in Southern Bukovina
Duchy of Bukovina